Mount Raymond is a rock peak, 2,820 m, standing on the southernmost ridge of the Grosvenor Mountains, 2.5 nautical miles (4.6 km) southeast of Mount Cecily. Discovered by Ernest Shackleton of the British Antarctic Expedition (1907–09), who named this feature for his eldest son. The position agrees with that shown on Shackleton's map, but the peak does not lie in the Dominion Range as he thought, being separated from that range by Mill Glacier.

Mountains of the Ross Dependency
Dufek Coast